Katerine Ruth Panter (born 3 May 1962) is a former British rower. She competed in the women's coxless pair event at the 1984 Summer Olympics.

Rowing career
As a teenager Panter joined the Weybridge Ladies ARC before Dan Topolski brought her into the British training squad along with fellow teammates Jane Cross, Belinda Holmes and Joanna Toch in 1979.

She was part of the eight that won the national title, rowing for an A.R.A Composite, at the 1982 National Rowing Championships. She competed at the 1983 World Rowing Championships before being selected to represent Great Britain at the 1984 Olympic Games, where she was part of the women's coxless pair with Ruth Howe. The pair finished in sixth place.

Medical career
She went to Cambridge University where she won three boat races and studied Medicine graduating in 1984.  She qualified as a doctor at St Thomas's in 1987 and specialised in Gynaecology. She became a fellow of the Royal College of Obstetricians and Gynaecologists in 2008 and was an accredited gynaecologist to the 2012 London Olympics.

International Rowing
 1979 Fisa Youth Championships 8th Coxed fours
 1980 Fisa Youth Championships 6th Coxless pair
 1983 World Championships 8th Eight
 1984 Olympics 6th Coxless pair

References

External links
 

1962 births
Living people
British female rowers
Olympic rowers of Great Britain
Rowers at the 1984 Summer Olympics
People from Great Barr